Areca whitfordii is a species of flowering plant in the family Arecaceae. It is found only in the Philippines. It is threatened by habitat loss.

References

whitfordii
Endemic flora of the Philippines
Vulnerable flora of Asia
Taxa named by Odoardo Beccari
Taxonomy articles created by Polbot